Parapercis robinsoni, the smallscale grubfish, is a fish species in the sandperch family, Pinguipedidae. It is found in the Western Indian Ocean, from the Red Sea to South Africa and north to Pakistan. 
This species can reach a length of  TL.

Etymology
The fish is named in honor of John Benjamin Romer Robinson (1869–1949), a South African attorney & a businessman.

References

Heemstra, P.C., 1986. Mugiloididae. p. 739-741. In M.M. Smith and P.C. Heemstra (eds.) Smiths' sea fishes. Springer-Verlag, Berlin.

Pinguipedidae
Taxa named by Henry Weed Fowler
Fish described in 1929
Fish of the Indian Ocean